Ampulex ferruginea is a species of cockroach wasp in the family Ampulicidae.

References

Ampulicidae